Dirkshorn (West Frisian: Durkshorn) is a town in the Dutch province of North Holland and the region of West-Frisia. It is a part of the municipality of Schagen, and lies about 9 km north of Heerhugowaard.

The village was first mentioned in 1573 as Dierickshorn, and means "corner of Dierick (person)". Dirkshorn is a dike village which developed in the Late Middle Ages.

The Dutch Reformed church is a Gothic Revival church which was built in 1868 to replace the 1659 church.

Gallery

References

Schagen
Populated places in North Holland